Richard Foster may refer to:

 Richard Foster (abolitionist) (1826–1901), founder of the Lincoln Institute in Jefferson City, Missouri
 Richard Foster (Alaska politician) (1946–2009), Democratic member of the Alaska House of Representatives
 Richard Foster (architect) (1919–2002), American modernist architect
 Richard Foster (Australian footballer), Australian rules footballer
 Richard Witty Foster (1856–1932), Australian politician
 Richard Foster (Royal Marines officer) (1879–1965)
 Richard Foster (Scottish footballer) (born 1985), Scottish football player
 Richard Foster (painter) (born 1945), British portrait painter
 Richard Foster (theologian) (fl. 2000s), Quaker religious leader and author
 Richard N. Foster (born 1941), managing partner, Foster Health Partners
 Richard Foster (philanthropist) (1822–1910), City of London merchant
 Richard Foster, a pen name of Kendell Foster Crossen (1910–1981), American writer

Characters
Richard Foster (The Walking Dead)

See also
 Richard Forster (disambiguation)